The John Anthony House is a historic residence in La Grande, Oregon, United States.

The house was listed on the National Register of Historic Places in 1988. By 2012, it had been adapted for use as professional offices.

See also
 National Register of Historic Places listings in Union County, Oregon

References

External links
 Anthony, John, House (La Grande, Oregon), University of Oregon Libraries

1890 establishments in Oregon
Houses in Union County, Oregon
Houses on the National Register of Historic Places in Oregon
La Grande, Oregon
National Register of Historic Places in Union County, Oregon
Queen Anne architecture in Oregon
Victorian architecture in Oregon
Houses completed in 1890